Bertil Fastén (1 April 1900 – 18 January 1928) was a Swedish athlete. He competed in the men's decathlon at the 1924 Summer Olympics.

References

External links
 

1900 births
1928 deaths
Athletes (track and field) at the 1924 Summer Olympics
Swedish decathletes
Olympic athletes of Sweden
Athletes from Stockholm
Olympic decathletes